The 2013–14 Scottish Youth Cup was the 31st season of the Scottish Youth Cup, the national knockout tournament at youth level organised by the Scottish Football Association for its full and associate member clubs. The tournament was for the under-20 age group, to complement current youth development strategies, having formerly been an under-19 competition. Players born after 1 January 1994 were eligible to play.

Rangers won the cup, defeating Heart of Midlothian after a penalty shootout in the final.

Calendar

Format
The sixteen clubs who reached the fourth round of the 2012–13 competition receive a bye to the third round of this season's tournament. The remaining twenty eight clubs enter the first round and are initially divided into three regional groups to reduce travelling. The tournament becomes an all-in national competition from the third round onwards.

First round
The draw for the first and second rounds took place in July 2013.

Central Group

One tie was drawn in this group with the following clubs receiving a bye to the second round:

Alloa Athletic
Arbroath
Clyde
Dumbarton
Dundee
East Fife
Forfar Athletic
Greenock Morton
Heart of Midlothian
Motherwell
Queen's Park
Raith Rovers
St Johnstone
Spartans
Stenhousemuir
Stirling Albion

North Group

No first round ties were drawn in this group with all the following clubs receiving byes to the second round.
Clachnacuddin
Cove Rangers
Formartine United
Fraserburgh
Keith
Lossiemouth
Ross County

South Group

No first round ties were drawn in this group with all the following clubs receiving byes to the second round.
Annan Athletic
Hawick Royal Albert
Queen of the South

Second round

Central Group
The following clubs received byes to the third round.
Dumbarton
Greenock Morton
St Johnstone

North Group
Formartine United received a bye to the third round.

South Group

Queen of the South received a bye to the third round.

Third round

The following sixteen clubs entered at this stage by virtue of having reached the fourth round of last season's competition:

Aberdeen
Ayr United
Celtic
Cowdenbeath
Dundee United
Dunfermline Athletic
Falkirk
Hamilton Academical
Hibernian
Inverness Caledonian Thistle
Kilmarnock
Livingston
Montrose
Partick Thistle
Rangers
St Mirren

The third round draw was announced on 24 September 2013.

Fourth round
The draw for the fourth round took place in October 2013 with ties played on 24 November and 1 December 2013

Quarter-finals
The ties for the quarter finals were played on 23 February and 2 March 2014.

Semi-finals
The ties for the semi finals were played on 12 and 13 April 2014.

Final

External links
Youth Cup on Scottish FA website

References

5
Scottish Youth Cup seasons